Lincoln Township, Nebraska may refer to the following places:

Lincoln Township, Antelope County, Nebraska
Lincoln Township, Cuming County, Nebraska
Lincoln Township, Gage County, Nebraska
Lincoln Township, Kearney County, Nebraska
Lincoln Township, Knox County, Nebraska

See also
Lincoln Township (disambiguation)

Nebraska township disambiguation pages